Ringer is a surname. Notable people with the surname include:

Entrepreneurs
 Frederick Ringer (1838–1907), British merchant
 Robert Ringer (born 1938), American entrepreneur

Performers
 Catherine Ringer, French performer
 Jenifer Ringer, American ballet dancer and teacher
 Noah Ringer (born 1996), American actor

Sportspeople
 Antony Ringer (born 1966), British sport shooter
 Derek Ringer (born 1956), Scottish rally co-driver
 Jamie Ringer (born 1976), Welsh rugby player
 Javon Ringer (born 1987), Michigan State University running back 
 Joel Bennett Ringer (born 1996), Welsh rugby player
 Paul Ringer (born 1948), Welsh rugby player
 Richard Ringer (born 1989), German runner
 Thomas Ringer (1883–1969), British boxer
 Tiana Ringer (born 1985), American wrestler

Writers
 Armand T. Ringer, a pseudonym used by American writer Martin Gardner
 Mark Ringer (born 1959), American writer and theatre director

Others
 Barbara Ringer (1925–2009), American civil servant
 Herb Ringer (1913–1998), American photographer
 Sydney Ringer (1836–1910), British clinician and pharmacologist, best known for inventing Lactated Ringer's solution